Nico José Herrera (born 1983) is a Venezuelan athlete specializing in the middle distance events.

He has personal bests of 1:48.60 in the 800 metres (2009) and 3:42.18 in the 1500 metres (2007).

Competition record

References

Living people
1983 births
Venezuelan male middle-distance runners
Pan American Games competitors for Venezuela
Athletes (track and field) at the 2007 Pan American Games
Athletes (track and field) at the 2011 Pan American Games
South American Games silver medalists for Venezuela
South American Games medalists in athletics
Competitors at the 2002 South American Games
20th-century Venezuelan people
21st-century Venezuelan people